The Australian Labor Party (Queensland Branch), commonly known as Queensland Labor or as just Labor inside Queensland, is the state branch of the Australian Labor Party in the state of Queensland. It has functioned in the state since the 1880s.

History

Trade unionists in Queensland had begun attempting to secure parliamentary representation as early as the mid-1880s. William McNaughton Galloway, the president of the Seamen's Union, mounted an unsuccessful campaign as an independent in an 1886 by-election. A Workers' Political Reform Association was founded to nominate candidates for the 1888 election, at which the Brisbane Trades and Labor Council endorsed six candidates. Thomas Glassey won the seat of Bundamba at that election, becoming the first self-identified "labor" MP in Queensland. The Queensland Provincial Council of the Australian Labor Federation was formed in 1889 in an attempt to unite Labor campaign efforts. Tommy Ryan won the seat of Barcoo for the labour movement-run People's Parliamentary Association in 1892, and the Labor Party was formally established in Queensland following the first Labor-in-Politics Convention later that year.

The Queensland branch subsequently formed the first Labor government in Australia, albeit briefly, when Anderson Dawson took office for a week in 1899 after a falling out between the non-Labor forces.

Since 1989, when the party came back to power after thirty-two years in Opposition, all its leaders have become Premiers despite two spells in Opposition in 1996–98 and 2012–2015.

As of 2020, the Queensland branch has three factions: the right, headed by Annastacia Palaszczuk, the left, headed by Steven Miles, and the centralist faction, the Old Guard. Discounting Speaker Curtis Pitt, of the 47 Labor MPs, 24 belong to the Left, 16 to the Right, and 7 to the Old Guard.

Leaders

Leader
The full list below is the official record of parliamentary leaders:

Election results

State elections

Federal elections

References
Notes

Citations

Queensland
Political parties in Queensland
Memory of the World Register in Australia